The Atchison Globe is a local once-weekly newspaper for Atchison, Kansas. The newspaper also maintains an online presence.

The newspaper was founded in 1877 by E. W. Howe. The Howe family sold it in 1951 to the editor, Paul Allingham and Winnie Allingham.  The Allinghams sold it in 1979 to Thomson Newspapers.  Thomson sold it in 1993 to American Publishing.  It is currently owned by News-Press & Gazette Company.

In 1989, its publisher, Larry Sarvey, was murdered at his home after being shot twice by a shotgun. The case was never solved.

References

External links
 Official website

Newspapers published in Kansas